Darwinzon David Hernández Afanador (born December 17, 1996) is a Venezuelan professional baseball pitcher in the Baltimore Orioles organization. He has played in Major League Baseball (MLB) for the Boston Red Sox.

Career

Boston Red Sox
Hernández signed with the Boston Red Sox as an international free agent in August 2013. He made his professional debut in 2014 with the Dominican Summer League Red Sox, appearing in 14 games while compiling a record of 1–1 with a 2.89 ERA. In 2015, he again played for the DSL Red Sox, compiling a 6–1 record with 1.10 ERA in 16 appearances. Playing for the Class A Short Season Lowell Spinners in 2016, he had a 3–5 record in 14 games, with a 4.10 ERA. In 2017, Hernández played for the Single-A Greenville Drive, appearing in 23 games while compiling a 4–5 record with a 4.01 ERA.

In 2018, Hernández pitched for the Class A-Advanced Salem Red Sox and Double-A Portland Sea Dogs, appearing in a total of 28 games while compiling a 9–5 record with 3.35 ERA. After the season, he played in the Arizona Fall League. The Red Sox added Hernández to their 40-man roster after the 2018 season.

In 2019, Hernández had a 0.82 ERA with the Red Sox in spring training, second only to Chris Sale, and was optioned to Double-A Portland prior to Opening Day. On April 23, Hernández was added to Boston's major league active roster for the first time, as the 26th man for the second game of a doubleheader. He made his MLB debut that day, pitching  scoreless innings against the Detroit Tigers while striking out four; he was optioned back to Portland following the game. Hernández was briefly recalled to Boston in late May but did not make an appearance.  On June 10, the Red Sox announced that Hernández would be recalled to make his first MLB start on June 11, against the Texas Rangers. In that start, Hernández struck out the first four batters he faced, but issued five walks in three innings, while allowing four runs on three hits and taking the loss. He was optioned back to Portland the next day. On June 15, Hernández was promoted to the Triple-A Pawtucket Red Sox, and he was recalled to Boston on July 16. In 29 games (one start) with the 2019 Red Sox, Hernández compiled an 0–1 record with 4.45 ERA and 57 strikeouts in  innings.

On July 4, 2020, it was announced that Hernández had tested positive for COVID-19. During the delayed-start 2020 season, he remained on the injured list until activated on August 20. He was again on the injured list from the end of August until September 18, due to a left AC joint sprain. Overall with the 2020 Red Sox, Hernández appeared in six games (all in relief), compiling a 1–0 record with 2.45 ERA and 11 strikeouts in  innings pitched.

Hernández began the 2021 season as a member of Boston's bullpen. On July 31, he was placed on the injured list due to a right oblique strain. He returned to the team on September 10. Overall during the regular season, Hernández made 48 appearances with Boston, all in relief, compiling a 2–2 record with 3.38 ERA; he struck out 54 batters in 40 innings.

Hernández opened 2022 in Triple-A with the Worcester Red Sox, until suffering a torn right meniscus that required surgery in May. He returned to Worcester in early July, was added to Boston's active roster on July 14, and was optioned back to Worcester on July 26. Hernández was also with Boston for 10 days in the first half of August, and recalled by Boston on October 3 for the final series of the season. In seven relief appearances with Boston during 2022, Hernández posted a 21.60 ERA with 0–1 record while striking out nine batters in  innings.

Hernández was designated for assignment on January 6, 2023, to make room on the team's 40-man roster due to the signing of Justin Turner.

Baltimore Orioles
On January 11, 2023, Hernández was traded to the Baltimore Orioles in exchange for cash considerations. On January 26, Hernández was designated for assignment by Baltimore following the acquisition of Cole Irvin. On February 2, he cleared waivers and was sent outright to the Triple-A Norfolk Tides.

References

External links

1996 births
Living people
People from Ciudad Bolívar
Venezuelan expatriate baseball players in the United States
Venezuelan expatriate baseball players in the Dominican Republic
Major League Baseball players from Venezuela
Major League Baseball pitchers
Boston Red Sox players
Dominican Summer League Red Sox players
Lowell Spinners players
Greenville Drive players
Salem Red Sox players
Portland Sea Dogs players
Mesa Solar Sox players
Worcester Red Sox players
2023 World Baseball Classic players